Elvira Krasnobaeva (Bulgarian: Елвира Краснобаева born 10 March 2008) is a Bulgarian rhythmic gymnast of Russian descent. She is the 2022 junior European hoop champion.

Personal life 
Krasnobaeva was born in Saint Petersburg, Russia but moved to Bulgaria at age six because of her parents' work. In 2021 she was given Bulgarian citizenship. Her dream is to compete at the 2024 Olympic Games, her idol is Margarita Mamun.

Career 
In 2021 Elvira was included into the Bulgarian national team in anticipation of the junior European and World Championships in 2022/2023. She then went on to became national champion ahead of Nikol Todorova and Zhana Pencheva. She was the silver medalist at the Julieta Shismanova tournament in Burgas. 

Krasnobaeva won the first two control trainings of 2022, being confirmed into the national team. In March she competed at the "Aphrodite Cup" in Greece where she was eighth with clubs, and the "Andalusia Cup"  is Spain. In the following weeks she won All-Around silver at the "Sofia Cup" grand prix. Elvira also retained her national champion title for the second time in a row. In June she was selected along Dara Stoyanova to represent Bulgaria at the 2022 European Championships in Tel Aviv, winning bronze in team, silver with ball and gold with hoop.

Elvira started the 2023 season at the Miss Valentine Tournament in Tartu, along Nikol Todorova, Dara Stoyanova and Dara Malinova she won silver in the FIG junior even behind Ukraine and above Kazakhstan. She also qualified for the hoop and ball finals, winning gold in both.

Routine music information

References 

Living people
2008 births
Bulgarian rhythmic gymnasts
People from Saint Petersburg
Sportspeople from Saint Petersburg
Russian emigrants to Bulgaria
Medalists at the Rhythmic Gymnastics European Championships